The Brotonne Bridge (pont de Brotonne) is a bridge in the region of Normandy in France, situated between the cities of Le Havre and Rouen.  It has crossed the Seine since 1977, to the east of the commune of Caudebec-en-Caux.  Its construction was financed by the General council of Seine-Maritime for the purpose of opening up the Pays de Caux and assuring a connection between the commune of Yvetot and the A13 autoroute by way of the forêt de Brotonne (Brotonne forest), from which the bridge gets its name.  Only two bridges are located further downstream the Seine from the pont de Brotonne: the Pont de Tancarville and the Pont de Normandie.

The bridge is a cable-stayed bridge (specifically of the fan design), whose principal span reaches  and is made of prestressed concrete.  It is considered an engineering feat and was the first bridge of this type in the world.

The bridge was a toll bridge until 2006, at which point crossing it became free.

The bridge is considered to be the inspiration for the much larger Sunshine Skyway Bridge in Florida.

Dimensions
Width: 
Pylons: 
Thickness of roadway: 
Carries 4 lanes

See also
 List of bridges in France

Bridges over the River Seine
Cable-stayed bridges in France
Bridges completed in 1977
1977 establishments in France
Former toll bridges in France